The leader of the Conservative Party (officially the leader of the Conservative and Unionist Party) is the highest position within the United Kingdom's Conservative Party.  The current holder of the position is Rishi Sunak, who was elected to the position on 24 October, following his unopposed victory in the party's leadership election. 

From the party's formation in 1834 until 1922, the leader of the Conservative Party was not a formal position; instead, there was a party leader in each chamber of Parliament, and they were considered equal unless one took precedence over the other, such as when one was serving as prime minister. Following the passage of the Parliament Act of 1911, the reduction of power in the House of Lords suggested that the Conservative leader in the House of Commons would be preeminent, but this fact was not formalised until 1922.

Since 1922, a leader of the Conservative Party has been formally elected, even when the party is in opposition. Originally, the party leader was appointed opaquely by other high-ranking members of the party. This process was gradually democratised in the late 20th century; in 1965, the appointment was linked to a vote by party MPs, and in 1998, the process was opened to all party members to decide between the last two candidates selected by parliamentarians. Under party rules, members can vote in the Conservative leadership even if they are not British citizens, do not live in the UK and do not have the right to vote in a UK general election.

When the Conservative Party is in government, as it currently is, the leader would usually become the prime minister of the United Kingdom, first lord of the Treasury and minister for the civil service, as well as appointing the cabinet. Concordantly, when the Party is in opposition, the leader of the Conservative Party usually acts (as the second largest party) as the Leader of the Opposition, and chairs the shadow cabinet. As of October 2022, three of the party's leaders have been women: Margaret Thatcher, Theresa May, and Liz Truss, all of whom have served as prime minister. Rishi Sunak is the first British Asian party leader and prime minister.

Selection process 
Under the party's constitution, leaders are elected by serving MPs and party members whose membership started at least three months prior to the closing of a ballot. Candidates must be serving MPs. A former leader who has resigned may not stand in the contest triggered by their departure.

Those who wish to stand must notify the 1922 Committee, a body representing backbench Conservative Party MPs, which has broad powers to set the rules of the leadership race (e.g. the minimum number of nominees candidates need).

The party's practice is for MPs to eliminate candidates through multiple rounds of voting until two remain, from whom the winner is then chosen by a ballot of party members.

The 1922 Committee's chairman acts as the returning officer for all stages of the leadership election process.

Overall leaders of the party (1834–1922)

Leaders of the party (1922–present)

Timeline

Houses of Lords and Commons leaders

Leaders in the House of Lords (1834–present)
Those asterisked were considered the overall leader of the party.

The Duke of Wellington: 1834–1846
Lord Stanley (14th Earl of Derby from 1851): 9 March 1846 – 27 February 1868*, elected at a party meeting 
The Earl of Malmesbury: 1868–1869, appointed by Prime Minister Disraeli
The Lord Cairns: 1869–1870, elected at a party meeting

Leaders in the House of Commons (1834–1922)
Those asterisked were considered the overall leader of the party.
Sir Robert Peel: 18 December 18341846*
Lord George Bentinck: 1846–1847
The Marquess of Granby: 9 February 1848 – 4 March 1848, elected at a party meeting 
None: 1848–1849
Jointly Benjamin Disraeli, the Marquess of Granby, and John Charles Herries: 1849–1852, elected at a party meeting 
Benjamin Disraeli: 185221 August 1876 (overall leader from 27 February 1868)
Sir Stafford Northcote: 21 August 1876 – 24 June 1885, appointed by Prime Minister Beaconsfield
Sir Michael Hicks Beach: 24 June 1885 – 3 August 1886, appointed by Prime Minister Salisbury
Lord Randolph Churchill: 3 August 1886 – 14 January 1887, appointed by Prime Minister Salisbury
William Henry Smith: 17 January 1887 – 6 October 1891, appointed by Prime Minister Salisbury
Arthur Balfour: 189113 January 1906, appointed by Prime Minister Salisbury (overall leader from 1902)
Joseph Chamberlain: 1906
Arthur Balfour: 190613 November 1911*
Bonar Law: 13 November 1911 – 21 March 1921, elected at a party meeting  (overall leader from 1916)
Austen Chamberlain: 21 March 1921 – 23 October 1922, elected at a party meeting

Elections of Conservative leaders by party meeting

House of Commons

House of Lords

Deputy Leaders of the Conservative Party
Deputy Leader of the Conservative Party is sometimes an official title of a senior Conservative politician of the United Kingdom.

Some are given this title officially by the party, such as Peter Lilley, while others are given the title as an unofficial description by the media, such as William Hague.  The first politician to hold the office as such was Reginald Maudling, appointed by Edward Heath in 1965. Distinct from being "second-in-command", there is formally no current position of deputy party leader in the party's hierarchy.

The term has sometimes been mistakenly used to refer to the party's deputy chair.

List of deputy leaders

See also

 1922 Committee
 Leader of the Labour Party (UK)
 Leader of the Liberal Democrats

Notes

References

 
Organisation of the Conservative Party (UK)
Conservative UK
Leader